The Australian land hermit crab (Coenobita variabilis) is a terrestrial hermit crab species, native to Australia. It is a nocturnal, omnivorous crustacean. They are gregarious and thrive in tropical areas near water.

Distribution
The Australian land hermit crab is endemic to northern parts of Australia including northern Western Australia, Northern Territory and northern Queensland.

Biology 
They closely resemble the Pacific hermit crab (Coenobita compressus) in appearance and they both have a shortened aquatic development stage.

Australian land hermit crabs are light brown to pale brown in colour, with two dark ovals on the front of the head. Their eyestalks are long and are the same colour as the body. Each claw has a dark vertical stripe. They have dark brown spots all over the legs. The abdomen is short and fat.

Shell preference

The preferred seashells of C. variabilis include Babylonia, Nerita, Phasianella, Thais, Tonna and Turban seashells. They are also found to be fond of several varieties of land snail shells such as Aratan snail and rice snail.

As the hermit crabs grow, they must exchange their shell for a larger one. Since intact gastropod shells are not an unlimited resource, there is frequently strong competition for the available shells, with hermit crabs fighting over shells. The availability of empty shells depends on the abundance of the gastropods and hermit crabs, but most importantly on the frequency of organisms that prey on gastropods but leave the shells intact. A hermit crab with a shell which is too tight cannot grow as fast as hermit crabs with well-fitting shells, and is more likely to be eaten. Although hermit crabs need to change shells regularly, they will not abandon their old shell unless they have a larger and newer one to change into and unless they feel safe.

References

Further reading

Hermit crabs
Crustaceans of Australia
Marine fauna of Northern Australia
Terrestrial crustaceans
Crustaceans described in 1909